The following lists events that happened during 2015 in Cape Verde.

Incumbents
President: Jorge Carlos Fonseca
Prime Minister: José Maria Neves

Events
January 8: The ferry boat Vicente sunk off the island of Fogo, killing 15 people.
August 31- September 1: Hurricane Fred struck the islands of Santiago, Boa Vista, Maio, Sal, São Nicolau, São Vicente and Santo Antão.
November 4: Zika virus was confirmed in the nation

Sports

CS Mindelense won the Cape Verdean Football Championship

References

 
Years of the 21st century in Cape Verde
2010s in Cape Verde
Cape Verde
Cape Verde